Parchment Creek is a stream in the U.S. state of West Virginia.

Parchment Creek was named after the local Parchment family of pioneer settlers.

See also
List of rivers of West Virginia

References

Rivers of Jackson County, West Virginia
Rivers of West Virginia